Ellen Contini-Morava is an anthropological linguist, interested in the meanings of linguistic forms, discourse analysis, functional linguistics and (noun) classification; in particular, in the relationship between lexicon and grammar. She specializes in Bantu languages in general, and Swahili in particular.

Education and career
Contini-Morava received her PhD from Columbia University in 1983 under William Diver and Erica Garcia. She is a professor emerita at the University of Virginia.

Books
Contini-Morava is the author of the book Discourse Pragmatics and Semantic Categorization: The Case of Negation and Tense-Aspect with Special Reference to Swahili (Mouton de Gruyter, 1989).

Her edited volumes include Between Grammar and Lexicon (edited with Yishai Tobin, John Benjamins, 2000) and Cognitive and Communicative Approaches to Linguistic Analysis (edited with Robert S. Kirsner and Betsy Rodríguez-Bachiller, John Benjamins, 2004).

References

Linguists from the United States
Living people
University of Virginia faculty
Year of birth missing (living people)
Place of birth missing (living people)
Women linguists